Paris Nights is a 2008 game developed and released by Gameloft for the J2ME platform. It is part of the Nights series by Gameloft.

Plot

Reception 
Paris Nights received generally positive reviews. Pocket Gamer said "Overall it's a lot of fun with a lot of tongue-in-cheek conversations and interactions and vast map-fulls of colourful visuals. There are just a few criticisms." They gave the game 8/10 points.

References

External links 
 Paris Nights on Gameloft
 Paris Nights official website 
 Link to Gameloft's wapshop for J2ME devices

2008 video games
Gameloft games
Single-player video games
Simulation video games
Strategy video games
J2ME games